The Civil Military Affairs Brigade (Reserve) is one of the units of the Technical Services Reserve Group of the Armed Forces of the Philippines Reserve Command, and is based in Quezon City. The unit provides combat support and service support services to AFP Reserve Force Maneuver Units operating within the National Capital Region, conduct community development operations, civil-military operations and co-operations in support of the IPSP Bayanihan.

Commanding officers
Unit Designation: Public Affairs Group (Reserve)
  Colonel Jesus G. Czabarrus (GSC) PAF (RES) - February 1997 to June 2005

Unit Designation: Public Affairs Service (PAS)(Reserve)
  Colonel Eduardo L. Lacañeta MNSA (GSC) PN (RES) - June 2005 to November 2009

Unit Designation:  Civil Military Affairs Brigade (Reserve)
  Brigadier General Joseph G. Sevilla AFP (RES) - November 2009 to November 2011
  Commodore Enrico Juan P. Talon AFP (RES) - November 2011 to May 2015
  Brigadier General Emmanuel Joaquin B. Guina AFP (RES) - May 15, 2015 to May 18, 2019
  Colonel Gerard V. Velez PA (GSC, RES) - 18 May 2019 to date

Brigade sergeant majors
 SMS Napoleon Mantilla (Res) PA - November 2009 to November 2011
 MSg Gaudencio Eleazar N Manalac (Res) PA - November 2011 to 2015
 CPO Arnel S Cruz PN (Res) - 25 May 2019 to date

Organization
The following are the units of the Civil Military Affairs Brigade:

Headquarters Units:

 Command Group
 Headquarters & Headquarters Support Group
 Media Affairs Group (MAG)
 Information Development Group

Field line units 

 1st Civil Military Affairs Group (Reserve) National Capital Region
 2nd Civil Military Affairs Group (Reserve) Northern Luzon
 3rd Civil Military Affairs Group (Reserve) Southern Luzon
 4th Civil Military Affairs Group (Reserve) Palawan
 5th Civil Military Affairs Group (Reserve) Visayas
 6th Civil Military Affairs Group (Reserve) Eastern Mindanao
 7th Civil Military Affairs Group (Reserve) Western Mindanao
 8th Civil Military Affairs Group (Reserve) No geographical designation

Training
 Civil Military Affairs Operation Course
 Special Forces Operations Orientation Training (Unconventional Warfare Operations Course)
 Scuba Diving Course (soon to be conducted by AFPRESCOM Diver by instruction of Lt Col Fabian H Versoza PA INF (SR) - Assistant chief of Staff for Education & Training, G8
 Explosives Ordnance Reconnaissance Agent Course
 K-9 Handling Course
 VIP Security Protection Course
 Air-to-Ground Operations System Orientation course

Awards and decorations

Campaign streamers

Badges

Gallery

See also
 AFP Reserve Command

References
Citations

Bibliography

 General Orders activating Civil Military Affairs Brigade of the AFP Reserve Command
 AFPRESCOM official site
 The AFPRESCOM Training Group, AFP-MOT Manual, 2001, AFPRESCOM

Brigades of the Philippines
Department of National Defense (Philippines)
Reserve and Auxiliary Units of the Philippine Military